Terrimonas rhizosphaerae is a Gram-negative, strictly aerobic and non-motile bacterium from the genus of Terrimonas which has been isolated from isolated from rhizospheric soil from a ginseng field from Geumsan in Korea.

References

External links
Type strain of Terrimonas rhizosphaerae at BacDive -  the Bacterial Diversity Metadatabase

Chitinophagia
Bacteria described in 2017